Nang County, Nangxian, or Langxian is a county under the jurisdiction of Nyingtri City in the Tibet Autonomous Region, China.

External links
Official website of Nang County government

Counties of Tibet
Nyingchi